Gord Christian (born March 6, 1946) was a Canadian football player who played for the Hamilton Tiger-Cats. He won the Grey Cup in 1967 and 1972.

References

1946 births
Hamilton Tiger-Cats players
Living people
Canadian football running backs